Elisa D'Ovidio (born 24 February 1989) is an Australian soccer player who last played for Australian W-League team Perth Glory between 2008 and 2015.

In 2006, D'Ovidio was adjudged the "Fairest and Best" player in the Football West Women's Premier League.

In 2016, she was selected as assistant Coach of the Western Australian Women's State Team for a match against Perth Glory Women.

References 

Australian women's soccer players
Living people
Soccer players from Perth, Western Australia
Perth Glory FC (A-League Women) players
A-League Women players
1989 births
Women's association football midfielders